Abbasabad (also Romanized as ‘Abbāsābād) is a village in Sharabian Rural District, Mehraban District, Sarab County, East Azerbaijan Province, Iran. At the 2006 census, its population was 36, in 9 families.

References 

Populated places in Sarab County